Fluorolintane (also known as 2-FPPP and 2-F-DPPy) is a dissociative anesthetic drug that has been sold online as a designer drug.

Fluorolintane and related diarylethylamines are antagonists of the NMDA receptor and have been studied in vitro as potential treatments for neurotoxic injury, depression and as sympathomimetic.

See also 
 AD-1211
 Diphenidine
 Ephenidine
 Lanicemine
 Methoxphenidine (MXP)
 MT-45
 Prolintane
 Remacemide

References 

Designer drugs
Dissociative drugs
NMDA receptor antagonists
Diarylethylamines
Fluoroarenes
Pyrrolidines